The 1988 Cup of the Soviet Army Final was the 6th final of the Cup of the Soviet Army (as a secondary cup tournament in Bulgaria), and was contested between Levski Sofia and Cherno More Varna on 1 June 1988 at Vasil Levski National Stadium in Sofia. Levski won the final 2–0.

Match

Details

References

Football cup competitions in Bulgaria
1987–88 in Bulgarian football
PFC Cherno More Varna matches
PFC Levski Sofia matches